Mary Alice Smith (December 3, 1936 – July 27, 2022), known professionally as Mary Alice, was an American television, film, and stage actress. Alice was known for her roles as Leticia "Lettie" Bostic on the sitcom A Different World (1987–1989) and Effie Williams in the 1976 musical drama Sparkle, and won an Emmy Award for Outstanding Supporting Actress for her recurring role on the series I'll Fly Away. Alice also performed on the stage, and received a Tony Award for Best Featured Actress in a Play for her appearance in the 1987 production of August Wilson's Fences.

Early life and education
Born Mary Alice Smith in Indianola, Mississippi, Alice was the daughter of Ozelar (née Jurnakin/Journakin) and Sam Smith. She showed an early and natural ability for acting, and began her stage career in her hometown. Her family moved from Mississippi to Chicago when she was two years old. She graduated from Chicago Teacher's College (now known as Chicago State University), and taught at an elementary school.

Career
Mary Alice returned to acting in the mid-1960s through community theater and appeared in three Douglass Turner Ward's plays, including Days of Absence and Happy Endings. Mary Alice also washed the cast's laundry for a salary of $200 a week. She did some acting in New York City during the late 1960s and early 1970s, performing in multiple productions at La MaMa Experimental Theatre Club in Manhattan's East Village between 1969 and 1973. Her first production at La MaMa was Adrienne Kennedy's A Rat's Mass in September 1969. She reprised her role as Sister Rat in the October 1969 production, and again in the January 1971 production. All three productions were directed by Seth Allen. In 1970, Mary Alice performed in Ed Bullins' Street Sounds, directed by Hugh Gittens. She later performed in Lamar Alford's Thoughts in December 1972 and January 1973.

Mary Alice made her screen début in the 1974 film The Education of Sonny Carson, and later appeared in the television shows Police Woman and Sanford and Son. She played Ellie Grant Hubbard on the soap opera All My Children during the mid-1980s, and the role of Cora in Stan Lathan's 1984 cult-classic Beat Street, as well as co–starred in A Different World as Leticia 'Lettie' Bostic from the series' start in 1987 until the end of the second season in 1989. She won an Emmy Award for Outstanding Supporting Actress in a Drama Series in 1993 for I'll Fly Away. Her other film credits include Malcolm X (1992), The Inkwell (1994), and Down in the Delta (1998). 

In 2000, she was inducted into the American Theatre Hall of Fame. She replaced Gloria Foster as the Oracle in the sequel The Matrix Revolutions (2003)  and the video game tie-in Enter the Matrix (2003) after Foster, who originated the role, died in 2001. She retired from acting in 2005.

Personal life and death

In her personal life, the American versatile actress was married to Paul Young, also known to be Mark Moses. They had been married for some time now. She passed away surviving her husband Paul Young and their only son Zach Kasch.

Alice died on July 27, 2022, at her residence in Manhattan at the age of 85 due to natural causes.

Filmography

Film

Television

Theatre

Video games

Awards and nominations

Notes

References

External links

TonyAwards.com interview with Mary Alice
Mary Alice's page on La MaMa Archives Digital Collections

1936 births
2022 deaths
20th-century African-American women
20th-century African-American people
20th-century American actresses
21st-century African-American women
21st-century American actresses
Actresses from Chicago
Actresses from Mississippi
African-American actresses
American film actresses
American stage actresses
American television actresses
Chicago State University alumni
Drama Desk Award winners
Outstanding Performance by a Supporting Actress in a Drama Series Primetime Emmy Award winners
People from Indianola, Mississippi
Tony Award winners